Howard Allen Chamberlin, Jr. is an American audio engineer and writer from North Carolina, most widely known as the author of the book Musical Applications of Microprocessors.

Biography 
In the 1970s while still at school he built an analog electronic music synthesizer and then a 16 bit computer from surplus IBM 1620 core memories to control it.

He was awarded an MSc in Communication Engineering from NCSU in 1973. The subject of his thesis was the design of a digital music synthesizer utilising an organ keyboard and a Tektronix 453 oscilloscope for a graphics display.

In November 1974 together with others began The Computer Hobbyist magazine.

In 1977 he first published wavetable synthesis in Byte's September 1977 issue and together with David B. Cox started Micro Technology Unlimited. At Micro Technology Unlimited, in 1981, he designed the 6502-based MTU-130/140 microcomputer and the Digisound-16 an early digital to analog converter.

His seminal book Musical Applications of Microprocessors was first published in 1979.

In 1986 he left MTU to work for Kurzweil Music Systems where he remained in one engineering role or another until retirement in 2014. While there amongst other projects he designed the Kurzweil K150

In 1992 he moved to Boston.

See also 
 Homebrew Computer Club
 AIM-65

References

Further reading 
 Musical Applications of Microprocessors by Hal Chamberlin, Hayden Book Co., 1980, 
 Musical Applications of Microprocessor by Hal Chamberlin, 2nd ed., Sams, 1985,

External links 
 Interview by Brian Cowell, Sonikmatter, January 2002. (archived)
 "Hal Chamberlin" search at Archive.org
 The Computer Hobbyist

Year of birth missing (living people)
Living people
American audio engineers
20th-century American inventors
American engineering writers